is an island in southern Hiroshima Bay of the Inland Sea, Yamaguchi Prefecture, Japan.

The highest point on the island is Mt. Kinzō. Economic activity on the island consists of fishing and cultivation of vegetables and citrus fruit.  Hashirajima is connected to the port at Iwakuni Mondays through Saturdays by a high speed ferry. 

Warships of the Imperial Japanese Navy that did not need dock repairs would anchor at Hashirajima, and it was also used as a staging area before fleet departures. It was also the site of the loss of the Japanese battleship , which suffered an internal explosion and sank there on 8 June 1943.

References

Imperial Japanese Navy
Islands of Yamaguchi Prefecture
Islands of the Seto Inland Sea